Ronnie O'Sullivan holds the record for the highest numbers of competitive centuries and maximum breaks, as well as the fastest maximum break of all time, in the professional sport of snooker.

Maximum breaks

Ronnie O'Sullivan has made fifteen official maximum breaks in professional competition, the highest number of maximums completed by any player. This total only includes maximum breaks that have been ratified by the World Professional Billiards and Snooker Association (WPBSA); it does not include maximums compiled in exhibition matches, or in events that are not sanctioned by the world governing body.

In addition to the fifteen maximum breaks officially recognised by the WPBSA, other high-profile maximums include a 147 compiled at the 2007 Irish Masters against Joe Swail in the quarter-final. The maximum break prize of a Citroën Coupe, worth €20,000, was withdrawn by the organisers when they were unable to obtain insurance against a 147 being made. However, this fact was concealed from the players and O'Sullivan only learned of the withdrawal of the prize after he had made the maximum.

O'Sullivan also deliberately refused at least one almost guaranteed 147 during the 2016 Welsh Open. He made this decision in protest against what he believed to be the insufficient prize money awarded for the maximum, which in that tournament stood at £10,000 for the 147 in addition to the £2,000 highest break prize. A similar incident had occurred six years earlier in a match at the 2010 World Open (listed as number 10 in the table below). In this case, however, he was eventually persuaded to pot the final black by the referee Jan Verhaas. O'Sullivan has been criticised for such behaviour, which has been labelled unsportsmanlike and disrespectful to snooker fans, as well as to the socio-economically disadvantaged, who might benefit from a charitable donation of the ostensibly insufficient prize money. However, he has defended his behaviour whilst also conceding that in hindsight he would rather have given the money to charity. In an interview, he asserted his right to enhance his own enjoyment of the game, as well as the spectacle for his fans, by engaging in such characterful, mischievous, and showmanlike behaviour.

Completed in 5 minutes and 8 seconds, O'Sullivan's first 147 break, against Mick Price in their second-round tie at the 1997 world championship, set a world record (yet to be broken) for the fastest maximum officially recognised in professional competition. Initially Guinness World Records recorded the time of the break at 5 minutes and 20 seconds. However, an investigation undertaken by Deadspin in 2017 revealed that the time recorded by Guinness World Records was incorrect, as a result of the timer being started too early on the BBC footage. Breaks are not officially timed in snooker and the official rules of snooker do not specify how they should be timed, instead leaving the timing to the discretion of the broadcaster. World Snooker has since suggested that a break starts when the player strikes the cueball for the first time in the break; this would result in a time of 5 minutes and 8 seconds, which is the time now officially recognised by both World Snooker and Guinness World Records. However, this methodology for timing breaks is inconsistent with the one employed in shot clock events where timing for a player's shot begins when the balls have come to rest from his opponent's previous shot, and under this convention the break would have been timed at 5 minutes and 15 seconds.

Additionally, O'Sullivan holds the record for the highest number of 147 breaks completed in the final frame of a match, having done so on six occasions. Of these six, one was in the deciding frame of his semi-final victory over Mark Selby at the 2007 UK Championship.

Full list
A full list of O'Sullivan's competitive maximum breaks is given below:

Century breaks
O'Sullivan had made 479 century breaks at the start of the 2007–08 snooker season. He made one century in the 2007 Euro-Asia Masters Challenge, seven in the 2007 Grand Prix, six in the 2007 Premier League Snooker before the 2007 Northern Ireland Trophy, and six more in the Northern Ireland Trophy, bringing his total to 499. His 500th century was recorded on 15 November 2007, in the second frame of his Premier League match against Neil Robertson.

At the start of the 2010–11 snooker season, O'Sullivan had made 597 century breaks. He made one century in the Players Tour Championship 2010/2011 – Event 1, and four during the Players Tour Championship 2010/2011 – Event 4 which was played from 14 to 16 August 2010, making his 600th century during the tournament. He had made 695 century breaks at the start of the 2013–14 snooker season. He made four in the European Tour 2013/2014 – Event 1 to take his century total to 699. His first-round match in the European Tour 2013/2014 – Event 3 was against Lyu Haotian on 16 August 2013; Lyu led 3–1 but O'Sullivan came back to win 4–3, making his 700th century in the deciding frame. He made his 750th century on 22 August 2014 in the 2014 Paul Hunter Classic against Robbie Williams.

O'Sullivan had made 773 century breaks at the start of 2015. On 13 January, in the first round of the 2015 Masters, he made two centuries to equal Stephen Hendry's record of 775. Two days later, in his second-round match, he broke Hendry's record, making his 776th century. He made his 800th century on 5 January 2016 in a Championship League group match against Barry Hawkins, and his 900th on 10 November 2017, in the semi-final of the Champion of Champions against Anthony Hamilton. His 1,000th century was recorded on 10 March 2019, in the final of the Players Championship against Neil Robertson. O'Sullivan made his 1,100th century on 22 March 2021, in his quarter-final match of the 2021 Tour Championship against John Higgins. At the 2022 Scottish Open, O'Sullivan scored a century in 3 minutes 34 seconds — just 3 seconds slower than the fastest televised century break, which was made by Tony Drago in 1996.

Partial list
Since the start of the 2007–08 season, O'Sullivan has made the following centuries:

Notes

References

O'Sullivan, Ronnie
Ronnie O'Sullivan